Marcello Marrocco (born June 7, 1969 in Bülach, Switzerland) is a retired Italian professional footballer who played in Serie B for Ravenna Calcio and in the Scottish Premier League with Dundee F.C.

After he retired from playing football, Marrocco founded a football technology business with former footballer, and his former manager and teammate at Dundee, Ivano Bonetti.

References

External links

1969 births
Living people
Italian footballers
Italian expatriate footballers
Expatriate footballers in Scotland
Italian expatriate sportspeople in Scotland
Scottish Premier League players
Ravenna F.C. players
Genoa C.F.C. players
Ternana Calcio players
Modena F.C. players
Dundee F.C. players
People from Bülach
Association football defenders